Julia Pace Mitchell (born Julia Annette Mitchell; February 10, 1978) is an American stage, television and film actress. She is best known for her role as Sofia Dupre on the CBS television soap opera The Young and the Restless (2010–12, 2019).

Personal life
Pace Mitchell is the daughter of former TV actress Judy Pace and actor Don Mitchell. She attended Hamilton High School Music Academy and graduated from Howard University with a BFA.  On May 22, 2013, at Atrium Medical Center, Middletown, Ohio, Pace-Mitchell gave birth to her first child, Stephen L. Hightower III.

Career
Pace Mitchell played the role of Jan in The Notorious B.I.G. biopic, Notorious, opposite newcoming actor Jamal Woolard who plays the title character. She appeared on the soap opera The Young and the Restless as business executive Sofia Dupre. Her first appearance was July 19, 2010. In September 2012, Mitchell was taken off her contract and bumped to recurring.  She made a return in 2019. She is now a recurring guest star on the CBS show Young Sheldon and the BET+ show All The Queens Men.

Awards and nominations

References

External links

Living people
1985 births
People from Middletown, Ohio
Howard University alumni
21st-century American actresses
American film actresses
American stage actresses
American television actresses
Actresses from Los Angeles